England Made Me is a 1973 British drama film directed by Peter Duffell, starring Peter Finch, Michael York, Hildegarde Neil, and Michael Hordern, and based on the 1935 novel England Made Me by Graham Greene. Tony Wollard's art direction was nominated for a British BAFTA Award. The film changes the novel's setting from Sweden to Nazi Germany. Duffel explained that he changed the location due to his lack of knowledge of Sweden in the 1930s, the use of imagery the audience would recognise and the growing menace in Europe of the time.

Plot
Anthony Farrant (York) is a naive 1930s businessman who pays a visit to Germany on the way home from a business trip, and falls under the politically dubious spell of charismatic financier Erich Krogh (Finch). While Anthony was taught to value fairness and decency, in Erich's world opportunism, corruption, and decadence hold sway.

Main cast
 Peter Finch - Erich Krogh
 Michael York - Anthony Farrant
 Hildegarde Neil - Kate Farrant
 Joss Ackland - Haller
 Michael Hordern - F. Minty
 Tessa Wyatt - Liz Davidge
 Michael Sheard - Fromm
 Richard Gibson - Young Tony
 Lalla Ward - Young Kate
 William Baskiville - Stein
 Demeter Bitenc - Reichsminister
 Vladan Živković - Heinrich
 Vlado Bacic - Hartmann
 Mirjana Nikolic - Nikki

Critical reception
The New York Times wrote of the film, "England Made Me might have worked, were Mr. Duffell and Mr. Cory less superficial movie makers. They've retained a surprising amount of the Greene plot, even a lot of original dialogue, but the story is no longer comic and rueful, just wildly melodramatic"; whereas Film 4 called it "an underrated adaptation of Graham Greene's novel...Although it received little attention when first released, this fascinating character study is ripe for reappraisal now, with the relationship between the two men making for quietly gripping viewing."

References

External links

1973 films
Films directed by Peter Duffell
1970s historical drama films
Films based on works by Graham Greene
Films based on British novels
British historical drama films
Films set in Germany
Films set in the 1930s
Films about businesspeople
Films scored by John Scott (composer)
1973 drama films
1970s English-language films
1970s British films